The Cerna is a left tributary of the river Olteț in Romania. It discharges into the Olteț near Budești. It flows through the communes Vaideeni, Slătioara, Stroești, Copăceni, Lăpușata, Lădești, Stănești, Fârtățești, Măciuca, Valea Mare and Bălcești.

Tributaries

The following rivers are tributaries to the river Cerna (from source to mouth):

Left: Marița, Recea, Stroești, Cernișoara, Drăgan, Braniștea
Right: Igiminea, Glămana, Omorâcea

References

Rivers of Romania
Rivers of Vâlcea County